Gusheh-ye Mohsen Ebn-e Ali (also Romanized as Gūsheh-ye Moḩsen Ebn-e ‘Alī and Gūsheh-e Moḩsen Ebn-e ‘Alī; also known as Gūsheh-ye Moḩsen and Gūsheh-ye Moḩsenebn) is a village in Shirvan Rural District, in the Central District of Borujerd County, Lorestan Province, Iran. At the 2006 census, its population was 1,076, in 267 families.

References 

Towns and villages in Borujerd County